Glen Alexander Mervyn (February 17, 1937 – March 18, 2000) was a Canadian rower, Olympic medalist and Olympic coach. He won Canada's only medal at the 1960 Summer Olympics and coached the Canadian National Rowing Team at the 1964 Summer Olympics.

He was born in Vancouver. Mervyn was a member of the UBC/VRC eights team that won the gold medal at the 1958 British Empire Games in Wales. He was also with the eights team that competed at the Pan American Games in 1959. At the 1960 Rome Olympics, he was the stroke (Captain) of the Canadian boat that won the silver medal in the eights event. This was the only medal the Canadians won that year. Glen coached the Canadian National team at the 1964 Tokyo Olympics, where two of his rowers won a gold medal in the pairs event.

He graduated from University of British Columbia and Harvard University.

External links

1937 births
2000 deaths
Canadian male rowers
Olympic rowers of Canada
Rowers at the 1960 Summer Olympics
Olympic silver medalists for Canada
Olympic medalists in rowing
Medalists at the 1960 Summer Olympics
Commonwealth Games medallists in rowing
Commonwealth Games gold medallists for Canada
Pan American Games medalists in rowing
Pan American Games silver medalists for Canada
University of British Columbia alumni
Harvard Graduate School of Education alumni
Rowers at the 1959 Pan American Games
Rowers at the 1958 British Empire and Commonwealth Games
Medalists at the 1959 Pan American Games
Medallists at the 1958 British Empire and Commonwealth Games